General elections were held in the Cayman Islands on 11 May 2005. 

They were won by the People's Progressive Movement, which took 10 of the 15 seats in the Legislative Assembly. Following the elections, Kurt Tibbetts was re-elected as the Leader of Government Business.

Results

References

Elections in the Cayman Islands
Cayman
2005 in the Cayman Islands
Cayman
May 2005 events in North America
Election and referendum articles with incomplete results